The School of the Sacred Heart is an international network of private Catholic schools that are run by or affiliated with the Society of the Sacred Heart, which was founded in France by Saint Madeleine Sophie Barat. Membership of the network exceeds 2800. The Schools of the Sacred Heart were brought to the United States by Saint Rose Philippine Duchesne, where the association became known as the Network of Sacred Heart Schools. Their philosophy has five goals:

Educate to establish a personal and active faith in God
Educate to establish deep respect for intellectual values
Educate to establish a social awareness which compels one to action
Educate to establish the building of a community with Christian values
Educate to establish personal growth in an atmosphere of wise freedom

List of Schools of the Sacred Heart

Schools highlighted in blue can be clicked on for more information.

Africa

Chad
Lycée du Sacré-Cœur, Ndjamena

Congo
École Maternelle Bosangani, Gombé
Lycée Tuzayana & École Primaire Filles, Mboma

Egypt
Collège du Sacré-Cœur, Cairo
Collège du Sacre-Cœur, Heliopolis
Sacred Heart Girls' School, Alexandria

Kenya
Laini Saba Primary School, Nairobi

Uganda
 Agriculture School Bongorin
 Kangole Girls' Senior Secondary School, Moroto
 St. Charles Lwanga G.T.C. Kalunga, Masaka

Asia

Korea
Sacred Heart Girls' Middle School, Yongsan, Seoul
Sacred Heart Girls' High School, Yongsan, Seoul

India
 Sacred Heart Convent Sr. Sec. School, Jagadhri, Haryana
 Children of the New Dawn School, Vasoli
 Prerana Nursery School, Pune
 Sophia Nursery School, Mumbai
 Sacred Heart Convent High School, Ahmednagar
 Sacred Heart Convent High School, Nashik
 Sacred Heart Convent School, Parichha, Uttar Pradesh
 Sacred Heart High School, Kharagpur, West Bengal

Pakistan
 Sacred Heart Convent School, Lahore, Pakistan

Japan
University of the Sacred Heart, Shibuya, Tokyo Metropolitan Area
International School of the Sacred Heart, Shibuya, Tokyo Metropolitan Area
Sacred Heart School in Tokyo, Sankocho-Minato, Tokyo Metropolitan Area
Sacred Heart School of Fuji, City of Susono, Shizuoka Prefecture
Sacred Heart School of Obayashi, City of Takarazuka, Hyōgo Prefecture
Sacred Heart School of Sapporo, City of Sapporo, Hokkaido Prefecture

Taiwan 

 Sacred Heart Girls' High School, New Taipei City
 Sacred Heart Primary School & Kindergarten, New Taipei City

Australia and New Zealand

Australia
Duchesne College, St. Lucia, Queensland
Kincoppal School, Rose Bay, Sydney, New South Wales
Sacré Cœur, Glen Iris, Victoria
Sancta Sophia College, Camperdown, New South Wales
Stuartholme School, Toowong, Queensland
Sacred Heart Girls College, Hughesdale, Victoria

New Zealand

Baradene College of the Sacred Heart, Auckland

Europe

Austria
Sacré Cœur Riedenburg, Bregenz
Sacré-Cœur Graz, Graz
Sacré-Cœur Pressbaum, Pressbaum
Campus Sacré-Cœur Wien, Wien
Campus Sacré-Cœur Wien Währing, Wien
Privatgymnasium der Herz-Jesu-Missionare, Salzburg

Belgium
Centre Scolaire du Sacré-Cœur de Jette, Brussels
Centre Scolaire Sacré-Cœur de Lindthout, Brussels
Centre Scolaire Sacré-Cœur de Lindthout Kindergarten, Brussels
Centre Scolaire Sacré-Cœur de Lindthout Primary School, Brussels
École Maternelle du Sacré-Cœur, Jette
École Primaire du Sacré-Cœur, Jette

France
École Primaire de Roucas, Marseille
École Primaire Sainte Odile, Montpellier
Lycée du Sacré-Cœur, Amiens
Institution de la Perverie, Nantes
Groupe Scolaire Sophie Barat, Chatenay-Malabry

Germany
Katholische Schule Herz-Jesu, Berlin
St. Adelheid-Gymnasium, Bonn
Sophie-Barat-Schule, Hamburg

Ireland
Mount Anville Primary School, Dublin
Mount Anville Secondary School, Dublin
St Catherine’s college secondary school, Armagh

Italy
Trinità dei Monti, Rome

Malta
Convent of the Sacred Heart Foundation, St. Julian

Poland
Sacré Cœur Nursery and Primary School, Tarnow

Spain
Colegio del Sagrado Corazon, Fuerteventura
Colegio del Sagrado Corazon, Godella
Colegio Mayor Sagrado Corazon, Barcelona
Colegio Sagrado Corazón Ikastetxea, Bilbao
Colegio Sagrado Corazon, Granada
Colegio Sagrado Corazon, Madrid
Colegio Sagrado Corazon Placeres, Pontevedra
Colegio Santa Maria de los Reyes, Seville
Colegio Santa Maria del Valle, Seville
Colegio Sta. Magdalena Sofia, Valencia
Colegio Sta. Magdalena Sofia, Zaragoza
Sagrado Corazón de Jesús-Rosales, Madrid
Sagrado Corazón de Pamplona, Pamplona

United Kingdom

England

 St Columba's College, St Albans
Sacred Heart Catholic High School, Newcastle upon Tyne
Sacred Heart High School, London
Sacred Heart Primary School (Roehampton, Wandsworth), London
Sacred Heart Primary School, Newcastle upon Tyne
Sacred Heart Catholic Secondary School, Camberwell

Northern Ireland
Mount St. Catherine's Primary School, Armagh
St. Catherine's College, Armagh

Scotland
Kilgraston School, Bridge of Earn, Perthshire
St. Joseph's R.C. Primary School, Aberdeen

North America

United States
Academy of the Sacred Heart, Saint Charles  Woonsocket, Rhode Island
Academy of the Sacred Heart, Bloomfield Hills, Michigan
Academy of the Sacred Heart, New Orleans, Louisiana
Academy of the Sacred Heart, St. Charles, Missouri
Carrollton School of the Sacred Heart, Miami, Florida
Convent of the Sacred Heart, Greenwich, Connecticut
Convent of the Sacred Heart, New York City, New York
Convent of the Sacred Heart (aka 'Seminary' & 'Academy' of the Sisters of the Sacred Heart), St. Joseph, Missouri 1855-1960
Sacred Heart Academy Bryn Mawr, Bryn Mawr, Pennsylvania
Duchesne Academy, Houston, Texas
Duchesne Academy, Omaha, Nebraska
Forest Ridge School of the Sacred Heart, Bellevue, Washington
Josephinum Academy, Chicago, Illinois
Newton Country Day School, Newton, Massachusetts
Princeton Academy, Princeton, New Jersey
The Regis School, Houston, Texas
Sacred Heart Schools, Atherton, California
Sacred Heart Schools, Chicago, Illinois
Schools of the Sacred Heart, Grand Coteau, Louisiana
Academy of the Sacred Heart
Berchmans Academy of the Sacred Heart
Convent & Stuart Hall, San Francisco, California
Stone Ridge School, Bethesda, Maryland
Stuart Country Day School, Princeton, New Jersey
St. Philomena School of the Sacred Heart, Portsmouth, Rhode Island
Villa Duchesne and Oak Hill School, St. Louis, Missouri
Woodlands Academy, Lake Forest, Illinois

Canada
Sacred Heart School of Halifax, Halifax, Nova Scotia
Sacred Heart School of Montreal, Montréal, Quebec
Sacred Heart Elementary, Delta, British Columbia

Mexico
Colegio Guadalajara, Guadalajara, Jalisco
Colegio Juan de Dios Peza, San Luis Potosí, San Luis Potosí
Colegio Sagrado Corazón, México 
Escuela Guadalupe, San Pedro Garza García, Nuevo León
Instituto Mater del Sagrado Corazón, San Pedro Garza García, Nuevo León

South America

Argentina
 Colegio Sagrado Corazón de Almagro, Buenos Aires
 Colegio Sagrado Corazón, Rosario, Santa Fé

Brazil
Colégio Pitágoras, Cidade Jardim Belo Horizonte
Escola Dunamys, Curitiba
Colégio Madalena Sofia, Curitiba

Chile
Colegio del Sagrado Corazon - Concepción, Concepción
Colegio del Sagrado Corazón de Apoquindo - Las Condes, Santiago

Peru
Centro de Educación Basica Alternativa (CEBA) Sagrado Corazón, Puerto Inca, Huánuco
Colegio Parroquial Sagrado Corazon - Trujillo, Trujillo
Institución Educativa Sagrado Corazón - Arequipa
Institución Educativa Sagrado Corazón - Chorrillos, Lima
Colegio Sagrado Corazón Sophianum, Lima

Uruguay
Colegio Sagrado Corazón-Paso Carrasco, Ciudad de la Costa

Notable alumni

Politics, public service

 Catherine Day, secretary general of the European Commission
Dianne Feinstein, United States Senator
Lucille May Grace, Louisiana Register of the State Lands, 1931–1952; 1956–1957
Caroline Kennedy, attorney and diplomat
Ethel Skakel Kennedy, human rights campaigner
Rosario Kennedy, former deputy mayor of the City of Miami, Florida
Sadako Ogata, former United Nations High Commissioner for Refugees
 Samantha Power, 28th US Ambassador to the United Nations
Mary Robinson, the 7th (and first female) President of Ireland, United Nations High Commissioner for Human Rights (1997–2002)
Jenny Sanford, the former first lady of South Carolina.
Eunice Kennedy Shriver, human rights activist
Maria Shriver, journalist and California first lady
Kathleen Kennedy Townsend, Maryland Lieutenant Governor
Empress Michiko (Michiko Shoda), Empress consort of Japan
Jean Kennedy Smith, diplomat

Society, fashion
Rose Fitzgerald Kennedy, socialite, matriarch of the American Kennedy family
Joan Bennett Kennedy, socialite
Leah McSweeney, fashion designer
Minnie Mortimer, fashion designer
Nicky Hilton Rothschild, heiress and socialite
Gloria Morgan Vanderbilt, socialite
Harriet Sylvia Ann Howland Green Wilks, socialite and heiress

Arts, entertainment
Karen Akers, actress and singer
Lourdes Benedicto, actress
Niia Bertino, musician
Jordana Brewster, actress and model
Sofia Carson, singer and actress
Dorothy Donnelly, actress and playwright
Megan Ellison, film producer for Academy nominated films such as American Hustle, Zero Dark Thirty, and Her.
Stefani Germanotta (Lady Gaga), singer
Salma Hayek, actress
Lauren Jauregui, singer and member of girl group Fifth Harmony
Margaret Mayo, playwright and actress
Christa Miller, actress
Myoui Mina, singer and member of South Korean girl group Twice
Carey Mulligan, actress, singer
Minnie Palmer, actress
Sarah Van Patten, principal dancer, San Francisco Ballet
Génesis Rodríguez, actress
Lillian Russell, actress and singer
Emily Rutherfurd, actress
Susan Saint James actress (McMillan & Wife, Kate & Allie).
Alix Smith, photographer
Frederica von Stade, singer
Elaine Stritch, actress and singer
Charlotte Selina Wood, child actress
Emma Corrin, actress

Journalism, publishing
Margaret Brennan, anchor and news reporter.
Theresa Hak Kyung Cha, author
Sandra Cisneros, author (The House on Mango Street)
Melissa de la Cruz, author 
Susan Konig, author and publisher
Andrea Koppel, journalist
Ana Navarro, Republican Party strategist and a political commentator for CNN, ABC and other broadcasters 
 Cokie Roberts, journalist

Athletics
Caroline "KK" Clark, American water polo player
Tierna Davidson, soccer player
Mary Joe Fernandez, American tennis player
Katie Ledecky, American swimmer
Lia Neal, American swimmer
Gaby López, Mexican professional golfer
Gabi Nance, Australian field hockey player
Erin Rafuse, Canadian sailor
Kelly Crowley, two time Paralympic swimming Gold medalist
Abby Dahlkemper, soccer player

Business, professionals
Mary Callahan Erdoes, '85, banking executive at J.P. Morgan Chase
 Elizabeth Plater-Zyberk, architect and co-founder of the Congress for the New Urbanism

See also
Schools of the Sacred Heart alumni

References

External links
 World Association of Alumnae and Alumni of the Sacred Heart
 The Associated Alumnae/Alumni of the Sacred Heart
 Network of Sacred Heart Schools - Official website
 European Network of Sacred Heart Schools - Official website

Private schools

Sacred Heart